Alissonotum piceum, is a species of dung beetle found in India, Sri Lanka, Myanmar, Bangladesh, Pakistan, Réunion island and Mauritius.

Biology
Male genitalia consists with  elongated phallobase, slender and oval paramere and much outward prolonged apex. Aedeagus is about 3.65 mm in size.

Both adult and grub are found in the furrows and the sugarcane setts. Sometimes they bore through the shoot bases. The species is known to parasitized by Tiphia parallela.

One subspecies is recorded: Alissonotum piceum besucheti, Endrödi, 1977.

References 

Scarabaeidae
Insects of Sri Lanka
Insects of India
Insects described in 1775